Joo-hwan, also spelled Ju-hwan, is a Korean masculine given name.  Its meaning depends on the hanja used to write each syllable of the name. There are 56 hanja with the reading "joo" and 21 hanja with the reading "hwan" on the South Korean government's official list of hanja which may be registered for use in given names.

People with this name include:
Lee Ju-hwan (1952–1972), South Korean traditional musician 
 Kim Ju-hwan (footballer, born 1982)
 Kim Ju-hwan (footballer, born 2001)
Jason Kim (director) (born Kim Ju-hwan, 1981), South Korean film director and screenwriter 
Lim Ju-hwan (born 1982), South Korean actor 
Choi Joo-hwan (born 1988), South Korean baseball player
Kim Ju-whan, South Korean dentist, member of the National Academy of Sciences of the Republic of Korea
Oh Juhwan, South Korean guitarist, member of Eastern Sidekick
On (born Choi Ju-hwan, 2002), South Korean singer, member of T1419

See also
List of Korean given names

References

Korean masculine given names